Yanbu Industrial City (ينبع الصناعية Madīnat Yanbu aṣ-Ṣināīyah) is a town and a south-western suburb of Yanbu Al Bahr in the Medina Region, in western Saudi Arabia.

See also 

 List of cities and towns in Saudi Arabia
 Regions of Saudi Arabia

References

Populated places in Medina Province (Saudi Arabia)